Yekaterina Smirnova (born October 22, 1956) is a retired heptathlete who competed for the Soviet Union during her career. She twice won the gold medal at the Summer Universiade. Smirnova set her personal best (6493 points) in the heptathlon on 19 June 1983 at a meet in Moscow.

Achievements

References
trackfield.brinkster

1956 births
Living people
Soviet heptathletes
Russian heptathletes
Universiade medalists in athletics (track and field)
Universiade gold medalists for the Soviet Union
Medalists at the 1977 Summer Universiade
Medalists at the 1979 Summer Universiade
Medalists at the 1983 Summer Universiade